Qikiqtaaluk (ᕿᑭᖅᑖᓗᒃ formerly Sillem Island is an uninhabited island in the Qikiqtaaluk Region of Nunavut, Canada. It is the second largest (after Bylot Island) of the several hundred islands and islets that are located in Baffin Bay, immediately off the northern coast of Baffin Island. It is defined by Clark and Gibbs Fiords, which join at its northern end to form Scott Inlet. Further north lies Pilattuaq.

Geography
The highest peak of the island reaches .

Popular culture
Qikiqtaaluk was the location for the fictional Barbeau Observatory in the film The Midnight Sky.

References

External links 
 Sillem Island in the Atlas of Canada - Toporama; Natural Resources Canada

Islands of Baffin Island
Islands of Baffin Bay
Uninhabited islands of Qikiqtaaluk Region